Daniel Hauser (born 1930) was a Swiss wrestler. He competed in the men's freestyle welterweight at the 1952 Summer Olympics.

References

External links
 

1930 births
Possibly living people
Swiss male sport wrestlers
Olympic wrestlers of Switzerland
Wrestlers at the 1952 Summer Olympics
Place of birth missing (living people)